A half hull model ship (also known as a "half hull" or "half ship") is a wooden model ship featuring only one half of a boat's hull without rigging or other fixtures.

Background
Prior to the twentieth century, half hull model ships were constructed by shipwrights as a means of planning a ship's design and sheer and ensuring that the ship would be symmetrical. The half hulls were mounted on a board and were exact scale replicas of the actual ship's hull. With the advent of computer design, half hulls are now built as decorative nautical art and constructed after a ship is completed.

See also
 Wooden model ship
 Marine Art

References

External links
Half Hull Boat Modelling:An Old Art Turned Full Circle 

Model boats
Model
Marine art
Ship design